Earl M. Hilton III  is an American university sports administrator and the current Director of Intercollegiate Athletics for North Carolina Agricultural and Technical State University, an NCAA Division I sports program of located in Greensboro, North Carolina.

Early life and education
Hilton received his Bachelor of Science degree in political science from Lamar University in 1992. He also earned a Master of Public Administration and Juris Doctor from Texas Tech University.  Hilton also served a mission for the Church of Jesus Christ of Latter-day Saints in South Africa.

Career
Hilton's career began at Texas Tech, where he served as an academic counselor. In 1997, Hilton became the assistant athletics director at the University at Buffalo, where he oversaw the departmental budget and served as the recreational and intramural supervisor. In 2000, Hilton became the assistant athletics director for compliance at North Carolina A&T. A year later, he was promoted to the position of associate athletics director for internal affairs, where he served as the finance, compliance and personnel director for the university's athletic department. Hilton spent the next eight years outside of athletics, an assistant vice chancellor for student affairs at the university. In 2010, Hilton was appointed the interim athletics director for the university, where he was later appointed to the position permanently.

References

Year of birth missing (living people)
Living people
North Carolina A&T Aggies athletic directors
Lamar University alumni
Texas Tech University alumni
Texas Tech University School of Law alumni